Ugo Martin (born 5 November 1998) is a French professional rugby league footballer who plays for Palau Broncos in the Elite One Championship.

In 2018 he made his Catalans debut in the Super League against the Warrington Wolves.

References

External links
Catalans Dragons profile

Living people
1998 births
AS Saint Estève players
Catalans Dragons players
French rugby league players
Palau Broncos players
Rugby league wingers